Lidiya Vladimirovna Vertinskaya, born Tsirgvava (14 April 1923 – 31 December 2013) was a Russian and Georgian actress and artist.

Vertinskaya was born of the emigre family of mixed Georgian-Russian origin in Harbin. Her paternal grandparents moved to China from Georgia along with their children while retaining Russian citizenship. Her father Vladimir Konstantinovich Tsirgvava was a Soviet official who served at the Chinese Eastern Railway. He died when Vertinskaya was nine years old. Her mother Lydia Pavlovna Tsirgvava (née Fomina), originally from a Siberian family of Old Believers, was a housewife.

In 1940 she met the Russian singer Aleksandr Vertinsky in Shanghai. Although he was 34 years older than her, they got married in two years. In 1943 they emigrated to the Soviet Union. She gave birth to Marianna Vertinskaya (born 1943) and Anastasiya Vertinskaya (born 1944), both successful Russian actresses.

In 1955 she graduated from V. I. Surikov Art Institute and started working as an artist. From 1952 on she also appeared in a number of movies, mostly fairy tales. In 1957 Aleksandr Vertinsky died, and she never married again. In 2004 she published a book of memoirs The Blue Bird of Love.

Lidiya Vertinskaya died on 31 December 2013 and was buried at the Novodevichy Cemetery in Moscow, near her husband.

Filmography
 Sadko (1953) as The Phoenix
 Don Quixote (1957) as The Duchess
 New Adventures of Puss-in-Boots (1958) as young witch 
 Kyivlyanka (1958) as Frau Marta 
 Kingdom of Crooked Mirrors (1964) as Anidag

References

External links
 
  

1923 births
2013 deaths
Actresses from Harbin
Russian film actresses
Soviet film actresses
Artists from Harbin
Actresses from Heilongjiang
Russian people of Georgian descent
Burials at Novodevichy Cemetery
Chinese emigrants to the Soviet Union